Alain Colm Pierre Rolland (born 22 August 1966) is a former Ireland rugby union international and rugby union referee. He also played for Leinster. He refereed the final of the 2007 Rugby World Cup, and was an assistant referee in the final of the 2011 Rugby World Cup. In September 2013 he announced his intention to retire from refereeing at the end of the 2013/14 season.

Playing career
He started the match on 27 October 1990 against , and gained further caps as a replacement against  in 1994 and the USA in 1995. He won 40 caps for Leinster, and played club rugby for Blackrock College. He also played 11 times for English club Moseley during the 1996/97 season.

Refereeing career

Rolland retired as a player at the start of the professional era and began refereeing, with his first Test appointment coming on 19 September 2001 when  beat  81–9 at Cardiff's Millennium Stadium.

Rolland refereed in the 2003 and 2007 Rugby World Cups and was appointed to referee the final of the 2007 Rugby World Cup.
Rolland, along with fellow Irishman George Clancy, was selected to a ten-man referee panel for the 2011 Rugby World Cup. He was an assistant referee in the final.

After the 2011 Rugby World Cup semi-final between Wales & France, Rolland received much criticism for awarding a red card to Welsh captain Sam Warburton in the 19th minute for a tackle which lifted France winger Vincent Clerc off the ground. Wales ultimately lost the semi-final to France, 9–8.

On 22 February 2014, Rolland refereed his last International match as Wales defeated France 27–6 in the 2014 Six Nations Championship at the Millennium Stadium in Cardiff. 

He refereed his last major European contest on 24 May 2014 in the Heineken Cup final at the Millennium Stadium.

Rolland is a member of the Leinster Branch of Referees. In March 2016 Alain was appointed as World Rugby's 'High Performance 15s Match Officials' Manager', having previously worked as a mortgage broker in Dublin.

References

External links

 http://www.rte.ie/sport/rugby/2016/0311/774207-alain-rolland-named-world-rugby-referees-chief/

1966 births
Living people
Irish people of French descent
Rugby union players from Dublin (city)
Irish rugby union players
Ireland international rugby union players
Leinster Rugby players
Moseley Rugby Football Club players
Blackrock College RFC players
Rugby union scrum-halves
Irish rugby union referees
People educated at Blackrock College
Rugby World Cup referees
Six Nations Championship referees
European Rugby Champions Cup referees
IRFU referees
The Rugby Championship referees
Irish rugby union coaches
Ireland women's national rugby union team coaches
Ireland international rugby sevens players
Irish expatriate rugby union players
Irish expatriate sportspeople in England
Expatriate rugby union players in England